The Third Round (1925) was the second silent film adaptation of the Bulldog Drummond character, starring Jack Buchanan and Betty Faire, adapted by Sidney Morgan from the novel of the same name by H. C. McNeile, and directed by Morgan.

Cast
 Jack Buchanan as Captain Hugh Drummond
 Betty Faire as Phyllis Benton
 Juliette Compton as Irma Peterson
 Allan Jeayes as Carl Peterson
 Austin Leigh as Professor Goodman
 Frank Goldsmith as Sir Raymond Blayntree
 Edward Sorley as Julius Freyder
 Phil Scott as Sparring Partner

References

External links
 
 Bulldog Drummond's Third Round at SilentEra

Films based on Bulldog Drummond
1925 films
British mystery films
British silent feature films
British black-and-white films
Films directed by Sidney Morgan
1925 mystery films
1920s British films
Silent mystery films
Silent thriller films